Enantiodrilus is a genus of South American earthworm in the family Glossoscolecidae.

References

Annelids